Sir Ernest Francis Swan Flower (24 August 1865 – 30 April 1926) was a British Conservative Party politician.

At the 1895 general election Flower was elected as the Member of Parliament (MP) for Bradford West, winning the seat from the Liberal Party on his second attempt, after unsuccessfully contesting the seat in 1892. He held the seat for 11 years, until his defeat at the 1906 general election. He stood again at both the January 1910 and December 1910 general elections, but lost on both occasions by a large majority.

Flower was a member of the Grand Council of the Primrose League, and was noted for his philanthropy in the East End of London.  He was knighted in the New Year Honours, in December 1903.

References

External links 

1865 births
1926 deaths
Conservative Party (UK) MPs for English constituencies
UK MPs 1895–1900
UK MPs 1900–1906
Knights Bachelor
English philanthropists
Members of the London School Board
Members of Parliament for Bradford West